Hiraya may refer to:
Hiraya, Nagano, village in Japan
Kinaray-a language, language in the Philippines